The list of Harrier family aircraft losses covers each incident in which a Harrier was destroyed or otherwise written off due to damage sustained.

List of losses

Notes
According to Indian media reports, as many as 16 out of a total 31 Indian Navy Sea Harriers were destroyed in crashes, which claimed seven pilots over a two decade period up to 2007.

See also

References

Notes

Bibliography

Bishop, Chris and Chris Chant. Aircraft Carriers. Grand Rapids, Michigan, USA: Zenith Imprint, 2004. .
Braybrook, Roy. Battle for the Falklands: Air Forces. Oxford, UK: Osprey Publishing, 1982. .
Brown, Kevin. "The Plane That Makes Airfields Obsolete." Popular Mechanics, 133(6), June 1970, pp. 80–83.
Bull, Stephen. Encyclopedia of Military Rechnology and Innovation. Westport, Connecticut, USA: Greenwood Publishing, 2004. .
Burr, Lawrence and Peter Bull. US Fast Battleships 1938–91: The Iowa Class. New York, USA: Osprey Publishing, 2010. .
Buttler, Tony. British Secret Projects: Jet Fighters Since 1950. Hinckley, UK: Midland Publishing, 2000. .
Congress Committee on Appropriations. "Department of Defense Appropriations for 1979: Part 5". Washington D.C., USA: U.S. Government Printing Office, 1979.
Cowan, Charles W. (ed.) Flypast 2. Windsor, Berkshire, UK: Profile Publications Ltd., 1972. .
Davies, Peter and Anthony M. Thornborough. The Harrier Story.  Annapolis, Maryland, USA: Naval Institute Press, 1997. .
Ellis, Ken. Wrecks & Relics, 21st edition. Manchester, UK: Crécy Publishing, 2008. .
Evans, Andy. BAe/McDonald Douglas Harrier. Ramsbury, UK: The Crowood Press, 1998. .
Farley, John. A View from the Hover: My Life in Aviation. Bath, UK: Seager Publishing, 2008. .
Freedman, Lawrence. The Official History of the Falklands Campaign. Volume II: War and Diplomacy. London, UK: Routledge, 2007. .
Friedman, Norman. U.S. Aircraft Carriers: an Illustrated Design History. Annapolis, Maryland, USA: Naval Institute Press, 1983. .
Gunston, W. T. "Pegasus updating prospects". Flight International, 22 January 1977, pp. 189–191.
Hannah, Donald. Hawker FlyPast Reference Library. Stamford, Lincolnshire, UK: Key Publishing Ltd., 1982. .
Jackson, Paul. "British Aerospace/McDonnell Douglas Harrier". World Air Power Journal, Volume 6, Summer 1991. pp. 46–105.
James, Derek N. Hawker, an Aircraft Album No. 5. New York: Arco Publishing Company, 1973. . (First published in the UK by Ian Allan in 1972)
Jefford, C.G., ed. The RAF Harrier Story. London: Royal Air Force Historical Society, 2006. .
Jenkins, Dennis R. Boeing / BAe Harrier. North Branch, Minnesota: Specialty Press, 1998. .
Layman, R D and Stephen McLaughlin. The Hybrid Warship. London: Conway, 1991. .
Markman, Steve and Bill Holder. Straight Up: A History of Vertical Flight. Atglen, PA: Schiffer Publishing, 2000. .
Mason, Francis K. Harrier. Wellingborough, UK: Patrick Stephens Limited, Third edition, 1986. .
Mason, Francis K. Hawker Aircraft since 1920. London: Putnam, 1991. 
Mason, Francis K. Hawker Aircraft since 1920. London: Putnam Publishing, 1971. .
Miller, David M. O. and Chris Miller. "Modern Naval Combat". Crescent Books, 1986. .
Moxton, Julian. "Supersonic Harrier: One Step Closer". Flight International, 4 December 1982, pp. 1633–1635.
Spick, Mike and Bill Gunston. The Great Book of Modern Warplanes. Osceola, WI: MBI Publishing, 2000. .
Sturtivant, Ray. Fleet Air Arm Fixed-Wing Aircraft since 1946.  Tonbridge, Kent, UK: Air-Britain (Historians), 2004. .
Sturtivant, Ray. RAF Flying Training and Support Units since 1912. Tonbridge, Kent, UK: Air-Britain (Historians), 2007. .
Swanborough, Gordon and Peter M. Bowers. United States Navy Aircraft since 1911. Putnam Aeronautical, 1990. .
Vann, Frank. Harrier Jump Jet. New York, USA: Bdd Promotional Book Co, 1990. .

Further reading
 Farley, John OBE. A View From The Hover: My Life in Aviation. Bath, UK: Seager Publishing/Flyer Books, 2010, first edition 2008. .
 Polmar, Norman and Dana Bell. One Hundred Years of World Military Aircraft. Annapolis, Maryland, USA: Naval Institute Press, 2003. .

External links

 Chronological Listing of Spanish Navy Harrier Losses & Ejections
 Chronological Listing of Royal Navy Harrier Losses & Ejections
 Chronological Listing of Indian Naval Air Force Harrier Losses & Ejections
 Harrier history website
 Harriers lost in the Falklands
  Up-to-date resource of all UK Harriers and Designations

Harrier
 
Harrier jump jet